Kirkuk Governorate or Kirkuk Province is a governorate in northern Iraq. In 2017, the estimated population was 1,259,561 people. The provincial capital is the city of Kirkuk. It is divided into four districts.

The province was named Kirkuk Governorate until 1976, when it was named At-Ta'mim Governorate, meaning "nationalization", referring to the national ownership of the regional oil and natural gas reserves. In 2006, the name "Kirkuk Governorate" was restored.

Governorate government

Governor:Rakan Saeed al-Jabouri 
Provincial Council Chairman (PCC): Rebwar Talabani

Districts

Demographics
Kirkuk Governorate borders were altered in 1976; when 4 districts were added to the Sulaymaniya, Diyala and Saladin Governorates. With these 4 districts, in the Kirkuk Governorate the Kurds would form a clear majority. The Kirkuk Governorate received the Arab populated Zab District from the Mosul Governorate.

With the Arabization policies of the Ba'ath party, the number of Arabs in official censuses increased fivefold within 40 years, however the most reliable data indicative of the ethnic breakdown of the governorate are those of the 1957 census. The number of Kurds remained relatively constant from 1957 until 1977, decrease in their numbers coincides with the Arabization process in the 1990s. The Turkmens were seriously affected by the Ba'ath changing Kirkuk borders their percentage fell from 21% to 7%.

Starting from 1977, 2,000 Christians (Assyrians) were registered as Arabs. From the end of the Gulf War to 1999, about 11,000 Kurdish families were deported from Kirkuk. Since the 2003 invasion of Iraq, 100,000 Kurds have returned to the city of Kirkuk.

Statistics 
Ethnic data from a League of Nations report from 1925 and British data from 1924, 1930 and 1931:

A report by the International Crisis Group points out that figures from 1977 and 1997 censuses "are all considered highly problematic, due to suspicions of regime manipulation" because Iraqi citizens were only allowed to indicate belonging to either the Arab or Kurdish ethnic groups; consequently, this skewed the number of other ethnic minorities, such as Iraq's third largest ethnic group – the Iraqi Turkmen.

2018 election results
The following is the results of the 2018 Iraqi parliamentary election in the Kirkuk governorate. Election results are often used to estimate the demographics of the region. However, Iraqi citizens do not necessary vote for parties based on its ethnic affiliation.

See also
2009 Kirkuk governorate election
Arabization and Kurdification
Disputed territories of Northern Iraq

References

External links
Iraq Inter-Agency Information & Analysis Unit Reports, Maps and Assessments of Iraq's Governorates from the UN Inter-Agency Information & Analysis Unit

 
Governorates of Iraq